Ajax—Pickering was a federal electoral district in Ontario, Canada, that had been represented in the House of Commons of Canada since 2011 by Conservative MP Chris Alexander.

Its population in 2001 was 100,215. The district included the Town of Ajax and the northern part of the City of Pickering in the eastern suburbs of Toronto. The electoral district was created in 2003: 57.6% of the population of the riding came from 43.3% of Pickering—Ajax—Uxbridge and 44.8% from Whitby—Ajax.

Following the Canadian federal electoral redistribution, 2012, the riding was dissolved.  The southern portion–including all of Ajax–became Ajax, while the northern portion became part of Pickering—Uxbridge.

Boundaries
Consisting of that part of the Regional Municipality of Durham composed of:

(a) the Town of Ajax; and

(b) that part of the City of Pickering lying northerly and easterly of a line described as follows: commencing at the intersection of the westerly limit of said city with Finch Avenue; thence easterly along said avenue to Valley Farm Road; thence southerly along said road and its production to Ontario Highway 401; thence northeasterly along said highway to Brock Road; thence southerly along said road and its production to the southerly limit of said city.

Member of Parliament

This riding has elected the following Member of Parliament:

Election results

See also
 List of Canadian federal electoral districts
 Past Canadian electoral districts

References

Notes

External links
 Riding history from the Library of Parliament
 Expenditures - 2008

Ajax, Ontario
Former federal electoral districts of Ontario
Pickering, Ontario